Everloving Records was founded in 2003, having been Enjoy Records from 2000.  With the success of Jack Johnson's debut Brushfire Fairytales the original, though defunct, Enjoy Records phoned up to reclaim their moniker.  Everloving began with Jack's album, which was produced by co-founder J. P. Plunier. The company began when A&R veteran Andy Factor and Plunier partnered, after having worked together for Ben Harper.  Plunier is Harper's manager and Factor was his A&R man.

Shortly after "Brushfire Fairytales", Everloving had a hit with Mad World from the film Donnie Darko.  That was composed by Tears for Fears and arranged by Michael Andrews and featured the vocals of Gary Jules.  It went #1 in the UK at Christmas 2003, two years after the film had come out.

Additional forays into film brought the soundtrack to "Dogtown and Z-Boys" and the score to "Me and You and Everyone We Know"

Canadian band Metric debuted on Everloving, as did Lowell George's daughter Inara George.  Both were produced by Michael Andrews.

Everloving's most recent success has been with Costa Mesa psychedelic/surf rock band The Growlers. The Growlers have released five studio albums: Are You In Or Out? (2009), Hot Tropics EP (2010), Hung at Heart (2013), Gilded Pleasures EP (2013), and Chinese Fountain (2014).

Everloving also has management and consulting divisions.

See also
 List of record labels

External links
Everloving Records

American record labels
Record labels established in 2003
Alternative rock record labels
2003 establishments in the United States